The men's 4x400 metres relay event  at the 1999 IAAF World Indoor Championships was held on March 6–7.

Medalists

* Runners who participated in the heats only and received medals.

Results

Heats
Qualification: First 2 teams of each heat (Q) and the next 2 fastest (q) advance to the final.

Final

References
Results

Relay
4 × 400 metres relay at the World Athletics Indoor Championships